A Gun for George is a 2011 short film written, directed by and starring Matthew Holness. It centres on Terry Finch (Holness), a down on his luck pulp-fiction crime writer who is angry at the world and haunted by the murder of his brother George by local gangsters. Finch is the author of a series of violent novelettes featuring Bob Shuter, aka 'The Reprisalizer', an urban vigilante who preys upon the criminals of east Kent.

The title of the film refers to Finch's brother and also to the name he gave to the Austin Allegro that Terry inherited from him. Finch frequently refers to features of the Austin Allegro such as the "quartic" steering wheel and its hydragas suspension system.

A Gun for George was produced by Warp Films and Film4.

References

External links
 

British short films
2011 films
2010s English-language films